Birgit Süß (born 29 March 1962 in Halle (Saale)) is a former German gymnast who competed in the 1980 Summer Olympics, winning a bronze medal.

References 

1962 births
Living people
Sportspeople from Halle (Saale)
German female artistic gymnasts
Olympic gymnasts of East Germany
Gymnasts at the 1980 Summer Olympics
Olympic bronze medalists for East Germany
Olympic medalists in gymnastics
Medalists at the 1980 Summer Olympics